Trevor Hogan (born 19 November 1979) is an Irish former professional rugby union player. He attended Nenagh CBS and Dublin City University, from which he obtained an honours degree in journalism. He played rugby with Nenagh Ormond, Dublin University and Blackrock College RFC before joining Shannon RFC in 2002 whom he helped to victory in the All-Ireland League. He played for Munster until 2006, when he joined Leinster. He retired in January 2011 due to a knee injury

Career
Hogan made his first start for Munster in 2003, where he went on to win 57 caps, 5 in the Heineken Cup. He scored, however, only one try in his spell there. While at Munster, he won his first Irish cap in 2005 against Japan during the Lions tour. He went on to win 3 caps for the national side. He went on to win 23 caps, including 7 Heineken cup caps, scoring 2 tries in the process. On 12 January 2011 he announced his immediate retirement from rugby at all levels. He cited that his decision was made due to persistent knee injuries over a number of years.

Post-Rugby
Hogan attempted to break the Israeli blockade of Gaza with the Freedom Flotilla in June 2011 along with other pro-Palestinian activists. With the aid of Dan Van Zyl and an unknown second row they   Before setting out, he wrote "The purpose, though, is not just to bring aid -- our goal is to end the siege and allow the people of Gaza to have their own functioning economy with the freedom to trade and travel, farm and fish their own territories."

Hogan became Nenagh Ormond RFC head coach in the Summer of 2011 and helped the club to gain promotion in the All-Ireland League. He subsequently moved back to Blackrock College RFC to take charge of the club's Under 20's academy. Trevor currently works with Leinster Rugby as Provincial Talent Coach.

References

External links
Munster Rugby Profile
Leinster Rugby Profile
Irish Rugby Profile

1979 births
Irish rugby union players
Ireland international rugby union players
Leinster Rugby players
Munster Rugby players
Blackrock College RFC players
Shannon RFC players
Dublin University Football Club players
Living people
Rugby union locks
Rugby union players from County Tipperary
People from Nenagh